Sutton Bridge is a road bridge across the River Thames near the village of Sutton Courtenay, Oxfordshire, England. It is a stone structure built in 1807 with three arches over the main river and two smaller ones across the flood plain. An extension was built in 1809 across the Culham Cut, just below Culham Lock. It was originally a toll bridge and replaced an earlier multi-arch bridge over the original weir and a ferry at this site. It is a Grade II listed building.

See also
Crossings of the River Thames

References

Bridges across the River Thames
Bridges in Oxfordshire
Bridges completed in 1807
Former toll bridges in England
Grade II listed buildings in Oxfordshire
Grade II listed bridges
Vale of White Horse